
Gmina Kamień Pomorski is an urban-rural gmina (administrative district) in Kamień County, West Pomeranian Voivodeship, in north-western Poland.

Villages
Apart from the town of Kamień Pomorski, Gmina Kamień Pomorski contains the villages and settlements of Benice, Borucin, Buniewice, Buszęcin, Chrząstowo, Chrząszczewo, Ducino, Dusin, Ganiec, Giżkowo, Górki, Grabowo, Grębowo, Jarszewo, Jarzysław, Kukułowo, Miłachowo, Mokrawica, Płastkowo, Połchowo, Radawka, Rarwino, Rekowo, Rozwarowo, Rzewnowo, Sibin, Skarchowo, Śniatowo, Stawno, Strzeżewko, Strzeżewo, Świniec, Szumiąca, Trzebieszewo, Wrzosowo and Żółcino.

Neighbouring gminas
Gmina Kamień Pomorski is bordered by the gminas of Dziwnów, Golczewo, Świerzno and Wolin.

References
Polish official population figures 2006

Kamien Pomorski
Kamień County